Coventry Road Cricket Ground was a cricket ground in Hinckley, Leicestershire. It was located along Coventry Road to the south, Trinity Lane to the east, with Trinity Vicarage Road to the north. Established in 1946, the ground had a capacity of 3,500.

History
The ground built after the Ashby Road ground ceased the host cricket matches shortly before World War II, leaving Hinckley without a venue for first-class cricket. Local businessmen subsequently joined forces to raise funds for construction of a new ground, with a Mr. Arthur Tansey donating three fields along the Coventry Road, upon which a pitch and pavilion was built.  First-class cricket returned to Hinckley in 1951, when Leicestershire played Derbyshire in the County Championship. From 1952 to 1957, Leicestershire played two first-class matches per season at the ground. Leicestershire didn't play in 1956, but returned the following season, where they proceeded to play one match per season until 1961. Two first-class matches were played in 1962, although Leicestershire didn't visit in 1963. The final two first-class matches to be held at the ground came in 1964, with Leicestershire playing Somerset and Kent. Seventeen first-class matches were played in total, with Leicestershire winning just once, losing eleven and drawing five.

Subsequently demolished, the site was used for a leisure centre.

Records

First-class
 Highest team total: 372 by Warwickshire v Leicestershire, 1954
 Lowest team total: 42 by Leicestershire v Lancashire, 1955
 Highest individual innings: 182* by Jim Stewart for Warwickshire v Leicestershire, 1962
 Best bowling in an innings: 6-20 by Brian Statham for Lancashire v Leicestershire, 1955
 Best bowling in a match: 9-66 by Brian Statham, as above

References

External links
Coventry Road at ESPNcricinfo
Coventry Road at CricketArchive

Leicestershire County Cricket Club
Defunct cricket grounds in England
Cricket grounds in Leicestershire
Hinckley
Defunct sports venues in Leicestershire
Sports venues completed in 1946